Crunch: Why Do I Feel So Squeezed? (And Other Unsolved Economic Mysteries) is a book written by Jared Bernstein, Chief Economist and Economic Policy Advisor to Vice President Joe Biden, and published in 2008. In it, Bernstein offers a layman's introduction to how the U.S. economic system works. Using economic inequality as the basis of his argument, Bernstein explains why Americans still feel squeezed during boom times, what he believes is wrong with the economy, and how he believes it could be improved for the greater common good.

Reception 
The book received reviews from publications including Publishers Weekly and Labor Studies Journal.

References 

2008 non-fiction books
Books about economic policy